General Peregrine Bertie, 3rd Duke of Ancaster and Kesteven  (171412 August 1778), styled Lord Willoughby de Eresby from 1715 to 1723 and Marquess of Lindsey from 1735 to 1742, was the son of Peregrine Bertie, 2nd Duke of Ancaster and Kesteven.

He married, firstly, Elizabeth Blundell (died 1743), widow of Charles Gounter Nicoll, on 22 May 1735. He married, secondly, Mary Panton, on 27 November 1750. They had six children:
Lady Mary Catherine Bertie (14 April 1754 – 12 April 1767)
Peregrine Thomas Bertie, Marquess of Lindsey (21 May 1755 – 12 December 1758)
a son (born and died 14 September 1759)
Robert Bertie, 4th Duke of Ancaster and Kesteven (1756–1779)
Priscilla Barbara Elizabeth Bertie, Baroness Willoughby de Eresby (16 February 1761 – 29 December 1828)

Lady Georgina Charlotte Bertie (7 August 1761 – 1838), married George Cholmondeley, 1st Marquess of Cholmondeley, and had issue.

On the death of his father in 1742, he succeeded him in the dukedom and as Lord Great Chamberlain and Lord Lieutenant of Lincolnshire, and was appointed to the Privy Council.

He gained the rank of Major-General on 19 January 1755, Lieutenant-General on 3 February 1759 and General on 25 May 1772.

References
 George Edward Cokayne, ed. Vicary Gibbs, The Complete Peerage, volume I (St Catherine Press, London 1910) page 128.

1714 births
1778 deaths
19
British Army generals
103
Lord Great Chamberlains
Lord-Lieutenants of Lincolnshire
Members of the Privy Council of Great Britain
Peregrine